You're My Destiny is a 2017 Thai romantic comedy television series. Starring Sukrit Wisetkaew
and ，The director is Worawit Khuttiyayothin.

It is produced by GMM Grammy.

The series is based on the 2008 Taiwanese drama Fated to Love You.

Cast
 Sukrit Wisetkaew as Pawüt Krisheepanine 
  as Wanida "Nid" Carreon-Krisheepanine

  as Kaekai
  as Phatchani Charon-Krisheepanine (Pawut's grandmother)
 Porapat Srikajorn as Thaya 
 Suchao Pongwilai as Bacủa Krisheepanine
 Tee Doksadao as Sano Carreon
 Mayurin Pongpudpunth as Darika Charon 
 Punpop Sitang as Amphai
 Sirin Kohkiat as Chun 
 Wattana Kumthorntip as Apichart 
Kitkasem Mcfadden as Tanawat

Ratings

See also
 Fated to Love You (2008 TV series)

References

External links
 You're My Destiny : siamzone.com

Thai romantic comedy television series
Thai television soap operas
2017 Thai television series debuts
2017 Thai television series endings
One 31 original programming
Fated to Love You